This is a list of women's Luxembourgian association footballers who have played for the first official international match of the Luxembourg women's national football team since the first match on 18 November 2006. As of 20 April 2011 the national team had played 19 international matches.

Players 
As of 1 June 2020

See also 
 Luxembourg women's national football team
 List of Luxembourg international footballers

References

 
Luxembourg
International footballers
Women
Football in Luxembourg
Association football player non-biographical articles